Peter Hore is an Australian-born man best known for public stunts such as disrupting the 1997 Melbourne Cup by running onto the track during the race, interrupting a tennis match at the Australian Open, and gate-crashing celebrity funerals.

During a World Cup football qualifying match between the national teams of Australia and Iran in 1997, Hore ran onto the field and cut the Iranian team's net. According to ESPN FC, the resulting delay was a turning point in the match, allowing the Iranian team to "regain their composure" and go on to win.

In 2007, Hore publicly told Queensland premier Anna Bligh that he would run for her seat in South Brisbane the following year. He ran against Kevin Rudd as an independent in the Division of Griffith in 2007, polling over 2,200 primary votes as "P.M. Howard".

See also
 James Miller (parachutist), dubbed "Fan Man", known for paragliding into major sporting events

References

Living people
People from Newcastle, New South Wales
Year of birth uncertain
Year of birth missing (living people)